Bollywood Ka Boss is an Indian quiz show on the Sahara Filmy television channel hosted by Hindi film actor Boman Irani.

Finalists 
 Ashutosh Mordekar (Mumbai)
 Svetta Mohla (New Delhi)
 Ravi Krishna (Hyderabad)
 Sameen (Mumbai)
 Mohit Garodia (Chennai)
 Ayushman Mitra (Kolkata)
 Harsh (Delhi)
 Nikhil Bhosle (Pune)
 Ameya Samant (Mumbai)
 Amit Pareek (Indore)

References 

2000s Indian television series
Hindi cinema
Filmy original programming